Terry L. Brown (born May 15, 1959) is a member of the Michigan House of Representatives, first elected in 2006, re-elected in 2008, defeated in 2010, and returned for a third and final term in 2012.

References

1959 births
Living people
Democratic Party members of the Michigan House of Representatives
People from Huron County, Michigan
21st-century American politicians